April is a Finnish metal band.

Discography

Studio albums
 Tidelines (2007)
 Anthems for the Rejected (2008)

EPs
 First Blood (2007)
 The War (2008)
 Power of One (2006)

References

Finnish alternative metal musical groups
Musical groups from Helsinki